Pouteria izabalensis is a species of plant in the family Sapotaceae. It is found in Belize, Guatemala, Honduras, and Nicaragua.

References

izabalensis
Near threatened plants
Taxonomy articles created by Polbot
Taxa named by Charles Baehni
Taxa named by Paul Carpenter Standley